Khadamabad خادم آباد  (also known as Khadimabad) is a town located in Tehsil Dadyal, Mirpur District, Azad Kashmir, Pakistan. 
The founder was named Haji khadam hussain.

Khadimabad bazar is a main bazar of union council Ankar. It was established after the making of Mangla Dam 1967 , before it there was Hill bazar important and mein bazar of union  Council Ankar. After the establishing of Mangla Dam the area of Hill bazar along with most of Mirpur district's area sank in the Mangala dam, after this the importance of Khadimabad Bazar was highlighted.

Populated places in Mirpur District